The Foster House is a historic house at 303 North Hervey Street in Hope, Arkansas.  The two-story wood-frame house was designed by Charles L. Thompson and built c. 1912. It is a fine local example of Bungalow/Craftsman style, with flared eaves and a full-length front porch supported by box columns, which are, in a Thompson signature, clustered in threes at the corners.  The porch roof, dormer, and eave have classic Craftsman features, including exposed rafters and brackets.  It is one of three Thompson designs in Hope.

The house was listed on the National Register of Historic Places in 1982, and was delisted in 2019.

See also
National Register of Historic Places listings in Hempstead County, Arkansas

References

Houses on the National Register of Historic Places in Arkansas
American Craftsman architecture in Arkansas
Bungalow architecture in Arkansas
Houses completed in 1912
Houses in Hempstead County, Arkansas
1912 establishments in Arkansas
Individually listed contributing properties to historic districts on the National Register in Arkansas
National Register of Historic Places in Hempstead County, Arkansas